Challhuani (possibly from Aymara challwa fish, -ni a suffix, "the one with fish") is mountain in the Carabaya mountain range in the Andes of Peru, about  high. It is located in the Puno Region, Carabaya Province, Ajoyani District. Challhuani lies southeast of Queroni.

References 

Mountains of Puno Region
Mountains of Peru